Gerald Michael Barbarito (born January 4, 1950) is an American prelate of the Roman Catholic Church.  He has served as bishop of the Diocese of Palm Beach in Florida since August 28, 2003.  He previously served as bishop of the Diocese of Ogdensburg in Northern New York from 1999 to 2003 and as an auxiliary bishop of the Diocese of Brooklyn in New York City from 1994 to 1999.

Biography

Early life and family 
Gerald Barbarito, the son of Anna Marie LaPorte Barbarito and Samuel A. Barbarito, was born in Brooklyn, New York, on January 4, 1950. He began his studies for the priesthood at Cathedral Prep Seminary in Fort Greene, Brooklyn, graduating in 1967.

Education 
Barbarito continued his studies at Cathedral College in Douglaston, Queens, where he earned a bachelor degree in 1971. His theology studies took place at Immaculate Conception Seminary in Huntington, New York, where he received a Master of Divinity degree in 1975 .Before his ordination to the priesthood, Barbarito served as a deacon at St. Francis of Assisi Parish in Astoria, Queens, for one year.

Ordination and pastoral work 
Barbarito was ordained to the priesthood for the Diocese of Brooklyn by Bishop Francis J. Mugavero at St. Francis of Assisi Church on January 31, 1976. After his ordination, Barbarito was assigned to St. Helen's Parish in Howard Beach, Queens. He remained there until 1981, when Bishop Mugavero appointed him assistant chancellor. Barbarito held this position for one year, then went to the Catholic University of America School of Canon Law in Washington D.C. for two years, where he earned a Licentiate of Canon Law.

Barbarito was named the vice chancellor of the diocese in 1984, remaining in that position until 1992, when Bishop Thomas V. Daily appointed him secretary. Barbarito served as master of ceremonies for Auxiliary Bishop Emeritus Joseph Denning from 1984 to 1990.

Barbarito has served on the College of Consultors, the Priests' Personnel Board, the Presbyteral Council and as an appellate judge at the diocesan tribunal. He has also served as a consultant to the Canonical Affairs Committee of the National Conference of Catholic Bishops. Barbarito is a member of the Catholic Biblical Association and the Canon Law Society of America.

Auxiliary Bishop of Brooklyn 
Barbarito was appointed as an auxiliary bishop of the Diocese of Brooklyn by Pope John Paul II on June 28, 1994. He was consecrated on August 22, 1994. Bishop Thomas V. Daily served as principal consecrator, with Bishops Joseph Sullivan and René Valero serving as co-consecrators.

Barbarito was assigned as regional bishop for Brooklyn Vicariate East as well as vicar for ministry for the diocese. As the vicar for ministry, he assisted with the ongoing formation of priests. His office was in the Marine Park section of Brooklyn.

Bishop of Ogdensburg

On October 26, 1999, Pope John-Paul II appointed Barbarito as bishop of the Diocese of Ogdensburg. He filled the vacancy left when Bishop Paul Loverde was appointed the Bishop of Arlington nine months prior.

Bishop of Palm Beach
On July 1, 2003, Barbarito was appointed by Pope John Paul II as the fifth bishop of the Diocese of Palm Beach to succeed Bishop Seán O'Malley who had been named archbishop of the Archdiocese of Boston.  Barbarito was installed on August 28, 2003, at the Cathedral of St. Ignatius Loyola. It was announced on January 30, 2015, that Barbarito would be undergoing surgery for a brain tumor.

Personal views
Barbarito considers himself to be a Republican and an opponent of abortion rights for women.

See also

 Catholic Church hierarchy
 Catholic Church in the United States
 Historical list of the Catholic bishops of the United States
 List of Catholic bishops of the United States
 Lists of patriarchs, archbishops, and bishops

References

External links 

Roman Catholic Diocese of Palm Beach Official Site

1950 births
Living people
People from Brooklyn
Catholic University of America alumni
Roman Catholic Diocese of Brooklyn
Roman Catholic bishops of Ogdensburg
Roman Catholic bishops of Palm Beach
20th-century Roman Catholic bishops in the United States
21st-century Roman Catholic bishops in the United States
Religious leaders from New York (state)
Catholic University of America School of Canon Law alumni